Charlotteville is an unincorporated community in Montgomery County, in the U.S. state of Georgia.

History
A post office called Charlotte was established in 1910, and remained in operation until 1933. The post office was named after Charlotte Mobley.

References

Unincorporated communities in Montgomery County, Georgia